PinOut is a pinball video game developed by the Swedish indie game studio Mediocre. It was released in October 2016 for Android and iOS. The goal of the game is propel a ball as far as possible before time runs out. After the first 7 levels the endless mode starts up

Gameplay 

The game has the basic appearance of a conventional pinball game, with a rolling ball propelled upward on the play field by hitting it with flippers.  However, unlike a conventional pinball game, the play field extends upwards endlessly.  The display follows the ball as it moves.  Multiple flippers are placed throughout the play field.  There is no drain; play is limited by a timer.  The challenge is to go as far as possible up the play field, within the available time.

The player controls the flippers by tapping the left or right of the screen.  The player can also hold the flippers to "catch" the ball, for a more precise shot.

To gain additional time, the player can hit glowing dots with the ball, gaining 1 second per dot.  If the time run out, the game ends.  There are ten checkpoints in the game.  With an in-app purchase, the player can enable restarting from past checkpoints, restoring their progress to that point.  Otherwise, players must start at the beginning.

If the player makes it past the main play fields, there is an "Overtime" mode, where the player keeps playing the same course until time expires.

Minigames 

There are four different minigames (one of these is easter egg to Does not Commute, another Mediocre AB game) which, when the player lose, the resulting score will be added to the timer.  These minigames appear in a small area at the top of the screen, reminiscent of the "video mode" minigames in hybrid electronic pinball games.

Power-ups 

Like the minigames, power-ups appear as colored orbs on the playing field, and are obtained when the ball touches the orb.  The game then offers the player a choice between two of the following:

 Slow Motion — slows the ticks of the timer.
 Time Freeze — stops the timer for 10 flips of the flippers.
 Motion Link — the timer ticks when the ball is in motion.
 Push — allows the player to move the ball in any direction.
 Warp — allows the player to skip part of a level.
 Time Doubler — makes the glowing dots worth 2 seconds instead of 1.
 Random — one of the other power-ups listed above is granted.

Reception 

Metacritic gave the game an average score of 81 out of 100, indicating "generally favorable reviews". Gamezebo gave PinOut a rating of 4.5 stars, praising its graphics and soundtrack, while criticizing the timer as oppressive. Pocket Gamer praised the originality, game-play, and aesthetics, but said it can be "a little tough".

See also 

 Smash Hit - another game from Mediocre involving balls

References

External links 

 Official website

2016 video games
Android (operating system) games
IOS games
Marble games
Pinball video games
Video games developed in Sweden
Single-player video games